Miss Brazil CNB 2018 was the 29th edition of the Miss Brazil CNB pageant and the 4th under CNB Miss Brazil. The contest took place on August 11, 2018. Each state, the Federal District and various Insular Regions & Cities competed for the title. Gabrielle Vilela of Rio de Janeiro crowned her successor, Jéssica Carvalho of Piauí at the end of the contest. Carvalho represented Brazil at Miss World 2018. The contest was held at the Hotel do Bosque in Angra dos Reis, Rio de Janeiro, Brazil.

Results

Regional Queens of Beauty

Special Awards

Challenge Events

Beauty with a Purpose

Miss Popularity

Miss Talent

Miss Top Model

Delegates
The delegates for Miss Brazil CNB 2018 were:

States

 - Hyalina Lins
 - Ruth Raphaela
 - Sheyzi Brazão
 - Jainy Lemos
 - Marcela Moura
 - Innessa Pontes
 - Marina Ramada
 - Camilla Syal
 - Kéren Farias
 - Izabela de Deus
 - Ingrid Matzembacher
 - Duda Magalhães
 - Isabella Garcia
 - Ariádine Maroja
 - Maisa Sanvi
 - Tallita Martins
 - Jéssica Carvalho
 - Mayara Costa
 - Sarah Torres
 - Joanna Camargo
 - Caroline Ferreira
 - Thylara Brenner
 - Sthefany Schunck
 - Franciele Alves
 - Marina Cerqueira

Insular Regions and Cities

 Agulhas Negras - Lara Gonçalves
 Brasília - Isabela Schott
 Costa do Sol - Gleycy Correia
 Costa Verde & Mar - Gabrielli Frozza
 Greater Curitiba - Endgel Cruz
 Greater Florianópolis - Helena Maier
 Greater São Paulo - Natália Negrão
 Ilha da Pintada - Tainá Laydner
 Ilha dos Lobos - Karine Martovicz
 Ilha dos Marinheiros -  Gabriela Freo
 Ilha Grande - Greice Fontes
 Ilhas de Búzios - Stéphanie Paula
 Ilhas de Ipanema - Andressa Scherer
 Ilhas do Araguaia - Adila Silva
 Ilhas do Delta do Jacuí - Vanessa Salva
 Marajó - Thaisi Dias
 Planalto Central - Karen Oncken
 Plano Piloto - Duda Estrela
 - Rafaela Martins
 Serra da Mantiqueira - Marcela Ribeiro
 - Agda Costa
 Vale do Paraíba - Jéssica Costa
 Vale do Rio Grande - Cristielli Camargo

Notes

Did not compete
 (competed as Miss Brasília)

References

External links
 Official site (in Portuguese)

2018
2018 in Brazil
2018 beauty pageants
Beauty pageants in Brazil